This is a list of members of the Senate of Canada in the 29th Parliament of Canada.

The province of Quebec has 24 Senate divisions which are constitutionally mandated. In all other provinces, a Senate division is strictly an optional designation of the senator's own choosing, and has no real constitutional or legal standing. A senator who does not choose a special senate division is designated a senator for the province at large.

Names in bold indicate senators in the 20th Canadian Ministry.

List of senators

Senators at the beginning of the 29th Parliament

Senators appointed during the 29th Parliament

Left Senate during the 29th Parliament

Changes in party affiliation during the 29th Parliament

See also
List of current Canadian senators

References

29
29th Canadian Parliament